Euriphene gambiae, the Gambia nymph, is a butterfly in the family Nymphalidae. It is found in Senegal, Guinea-Bissau, Guinea, Sierra Leone, Liberia, Ivory Coast, Ghana, Nigeria, Cameroon, Gabon, the Republic of the Congo, Angola and the Democratic Republic of the Congo. The habitat consists of forests.

Subspecies
Euriphene gambiae gambiae (Senegal, Guinea-Bissau, southern Guinea)
Euriphene gambiae gabonica Bernardi, 1966 (southern Nigeria, Cameroon, Gabon, Congo, Angola, Democratic Republic of the Congo: Mayumbe, Uele, northern Kivu, Tshopo, Equateur, Cataractes, Sankuru)
Euriphene gambiae vera Hecq, 2002 (eastern Guinea, Sierra Leone, Liberia, Ivory Coast, Ghana)

References

Butterflies described in 1850
Euriphene